David Luke Custer (born October 14, 1980) is a journalist and television anchor and reporter. He currently works as the anchor of the 5pm, 6pm and 11pm news with Meg McLeod on Mid-Michigan's CBS affiliate channel WNEM.

David Custer was born in Flint, Michigan, and lived in Goodrich, Michigan for most of his childhood and young adult life. He attended Goodrich High School, home of the Martians, and the University of Michigan's Flint campus, graduating with a degree in communications in 2001.

Custer's journey into television started as an anchor and a reporter in Alpena, Michigan, in 2002. The station, WBKB, also known as the ‘Sunrise Side’, was the only news station in the area. After spending a couple years at WBKB, Custer moved to WSMH, a Fox affiliate, near his hometown in Flint, Michigan, as both a reporter and a producer. He quickly transitioned from a reporter to weekend anchor. The station merged with the CBS affiliate and he became the weekend morning anchor for WNEM-TV until the summer of 2007. Custer briefly left television in 2007 and early 2008 to pursue an executive position in the culinary field at Country Home Creations, an international manufacturer specializing in gourmet food products.

References

Living people
1980 births
University of Michigan–Flint alumni